Ganoderols are triterpenes isolated from Ganoderma lucidum.

References

Steroids